Chrysocephalum pterochaetum, known by the common name perennial sunray is a perennial herb native to outback and desert areas of Australia. A member of the Asteraceae, the daisy family. A small plant, 15 to 40 cm high with many stems. Leaves are linear to linear oblanceolate in shape, 10 to 30 mm long, 1 to 1.5 mm wide. Leaf surfaces are rough and glandular, and may have felty white hairs. Yellow flowers mostly form throughout the year, but often seen from June to October. Originally collected in 1851 near Kanyaka, South Australia. The habitat of this plant includes sand among rocks, in or near dry creek beds, exposed rocky hill slopes and sandy gibber. The specific epithet pterochaetum is derived from the Ancient Greek language, ptero (winged) and chaetum (hair).

References

Gnaphalieae
Asterales of Australia
Flora of New South Wales
Flora of South Australia
Flora of Queensland
Flora of Western Australia
Flora of the Northern Territory
Plants described in 1853